Robert Hartley Elliott (born 8 December 1941) is an English rock drummer, best known for playing with The Hollies. He has been described as "one of the very finest drummers in all of pop/rock".

Early life
Elliott discovered jazz music when he was 10 or 11 and wanted to become a drummer. He attended Nelson Grammar School. Elliott self-taught himself how to play the drums, by using home-made brushes and sticks, on tins and other household items, and copying the playing of  Chico Hamilton of the Gerry Mulligan Quartet and Gene Krupa of the Benny Goodman Orchestra.

Career

Shane Fenton and the Fentones 
Elliott was an original member of Johnny Theakston and The Tremeloes, who formed in 1959, and were fronted by the vocalist Johnny Theakston. In late 1960 they sent a demo tape to BBC Radio's Saturday Club, calling themselves Shane Fenton & The Fentones, but Theakston died before they received a reply. Having been offered an audition, the band's roadie Bernard Jewry (later known as Alvin Stardust), stepped in as vocalist, adopting the stage name “Shane Fenton” at Theakston's mother's request.

Tommy Sanderson became their manager, and negotiated a record deal with EMI who released "I'm a Moody Guy", which reached 19 on the UK singles chart. The next three singles failed to chart, and the band broke up in April 1963.

The Hollies 

Bobby played in Ricky Shaw and the Dolphins, a band led by guitarist Tony Hicks who left to join The Hollies. Shortly after, Don Rathbone left the Hollies and Elliott replaced him.

The Hollies would quickly garner a cult following after their songs Here I Go Again, Look Through Any Window, and Just One Look charted in the British charts. Future hits would include: "Bus Stop", "On a Carousel", "Carrie Anne", "He Ain't Heavy, He's My Brother" and "The Air That I Breathe", among others.

Elliott’s hair began thinning at a young age (around the time the Hollies took off). So on stage, he would wear a variety of hats to cover up his balding. This decision would eventually inspire more artists (balding or not) to wear hats on stage, helping to bring wearing hats into Rock and Roll. By the 1970s, Elliott had gone completely bald and eventually, Elliott, a blonde, started wearing a long brunette wig on stage.

As of 2023, Elliott and Hicks still tour with the Hollies. The Hollies were inducted into the Rock and Roll Hall of Fame in 2010.

Personal life
Elliott had a long relationship with Maureen Hicks. Thanks to this relationship Elliott would meet Maureen's brother, Tony Hicks. Bobby is married to Susan Elliott

In September 1973, Paul McCartney offered him the position of drummer in his band Wings, but Elliott declined due to commitments with The Hollies.

Prominent drummers who were influenced by Elliott include Gilson Lavis, Ric Lee, Cozy Powell and Ian Paice.

Discography 

 Stay with The Hollies (1964)
 In The Hollies Style (1964)
 Hollies (1965)
 Would You Believe? (1966)
 For Certain Because (1966)
 Evolution (1967)
 Butterfly (1967)
 Hollies Sing Dylan (1969)
 Hollies Sing Hollies (1969)
 Confessions of the Mind (1970)
 Distant Light (1971)
 Romany (1972)
 Out on the Road (1973)
 Hollies (1974)
 Another Night (1975)
 Write On (1976)
 Russian Roulette (1976)
 A Crazy Steal (1978)
 Five Three One-Double Seven o Four (1979)
 Buddy Holly (1980)
 What Goes Around... (1983)
 Staying Power (2006)
 Then, Now, Always (2009)

References

1941 births
Living people
English rock drummers
People from Burnley
Musicians from Manchester
The Hollies members